Salman Haneef Chaudhry (born 1 February 1981) is a Pakistani politician who had been a member of the National Assembly of Pakistan, from June 2013 to May 2018.

Early life
He was born on 1 February 1981.

Political career

He was elected to the National Assembly of Pakistan as a candidate of Pakistan Muslim League (N) from Constituency NA-138 (Kasur-I) in 2013 Pakistani general election. He received 75,694 votes and defeated an independent candidate, Sardar Tufail Ahmad Khan.

Controversies
In December 2014, it was reported that Chaudhry manhandled and beaten the headmaster of a local school in Kasur. It was reported that Chaudhry had demanded a passage from the school ground for the land of his relative and did not want a portion of the wall to be raised. Some students pelted Haneef with bricks and scared him away by brandishing sticks.

References

Living people
Pakistan Muslim League (N) politicians
Punjabi people
Pakistani MNAs 2013–2018
1981 births